Johann August Nauck (18 September 1822 – 3 August 1892) was a German classical scholar and critic. His chief work was the Tragicorum Graecorum Fragmenta (TrGF).

Biography 
Nauck was born at Auerstedt in present-day Thuringia.  He studied at the University of Halle as a student of Gottfried Bernhardy and Moritz Hermann Eduard Meier. In 1853 he became an adjunct under August Meineke at the Joachimsthal Gymnasium in Berlin. After a brief stint as an educator at the Grauen Kloster (1858), he relocated to St. Petersburg, where in 1869, he was appointed professor of Greek at the historical-philological institute.

Nauck was one of the most distinguished textual critics of his day, although, like PH Peerlkamp, he was fond of altering a text in accordance with what he thought the author must, or ought to, have written. Nauck was elected a foreign member of the Royal Netherlands Academy of Arts and Sciences in 1885.

Published works 
The most important of his writings and translations, all of which deal with Greek language and literature (especially the tragedians) are as follows:
 Fragments of Aristophanes of Byzantium (1848).
 Euripidis Tragoediae superstites et deperditarum fragmenta; ex recensione Augusti Nauckii, (1854). (Euripides, tragedies and fragments)
 Tragicorum Graecorum Fragmenta (1856, last edition, 1983), His chief work — it was intended as a counterpart to Meineke's "comedy fragments", ("Fragmenta comicorum graecorum").
 Revised edition of Schneidewin's annotated Sophocles (1856, etc.)
 Porphyrius of Tyre (1860, 2nd ed., 1886); "Porphyrii philosophi Platonici opuscula selecta".
 Lexikon Vindobonense (1867).
 texts of Homer, Odyssey (1874) and Iliad (1877–1879); published as "Homerica carmina" (volume I. Ilias; volume II. Odyssea).
 Iamblichus, De Vita Pythagorica (1884).

References

External links 
Tragicorum graecorum fragmenta recensuit Augustus Nauck, Lipsiae sumptibus et typis B. G. Teubneri, 1856.
Tragicorum graecorum fragmenta recensuit Augustus Nauck, editio secunda, Lipsiae in aedibus B. G. Teubneri, 1889.

Further reading
Memoir by T Zielinski, in Bursian's Biographisches Jahrbuch (1894), and JE Sandys, History of Classical Scholarship, iii. (1908), pp. 149–152.

1822 births
1892 deaths
People from Weimarer Land
German classical philologists
German classical scholars
Members of the Royal Netherlands Academy of Arts and Sciences
Academic staff of Saint Petersburg State University
University of Halle alumni